Soji Kashiwagi (born 1962 in Oakland, California) is a Sansei (third-generation Japanese American) journalist, playwright and producer. He is the Executive Producer for the Grateful Crane Ensemble theatre company in Los Angeles. He has contributed to The Rafu Shimpo with his column, "Corner Store." He is the son of Nisei playwright Hiroshi Kashiwagi.

Education
Kashiwagi grew up in San Francisco and graduated from Lowell High School and San Francisco State University, majoring in Journalism. He also studied film production at Visual Communications (VC) and play writing at East West Players, in Los Angeles.

Career
Kashiwagi's comedy play The Grapevine was produced in 1993 at the Los Angeles Theatre Center. In 2001 he formed a theatre company, the Grateful Crane Ensemble, where for several years he wrote and produced bilingual (Japanese and English) shows using music, song and story, to entertain Japanese American senior citizens at the Keiro Retirement Home in East Los Angeles In 2003, Kashiwagi wrote the play The Camp Dance: The Music & The Memories, which was produced by Grateful Crane, toured the Western U.S., and received the 2006 Ruby Yoshino Schaar Playwright Award from the New York/National Japanese American Citizens League. Kashiwagi wrote Nihonmachi: The Place To Be – A Musical Journey, which Grateful Crane first produced in 2006 at the Japanese Cultural and Community Center of Northern California, as part of the 100th-anniversary celebration of San Francisco's Japantown. Both Camp Dance and Nihonmachi have continued to be performed by Grateful Crane. In 2009, Kashiwagi received a California Civil Liberties Public Education Program grant to produce his father's play, The Betrayed, which will be presented by the Grateful Crane Ensemble in 2010 at the Japanese American National Museum.

Plays
 The Grapevine
 The Camp Dance: The Music & The Memories
 Nihonmachi: The Place to Be

Awards
 2006 Ruby Yoshino Schaar Playwright Award – The Camp Dance: The Music & The Memories

References

External links
 Grateful Crane Ensemble website
 Nichi Bei Times article by Kashiwagi about Tule Lake Pilgrimage (7/23/09)

1962 births
Living people
American dramatists and playwrights of Japanese descent
American writers of Japanese descent
Writers from San Francisco
Lowell High School (San Francisco) alumni
San Francisco State University alumni
American male dramatists and playwrights
American male journalists
American journalists of Asian descent
20th-century American journalists
21st-century American journalists
20th-century American dramatists and playwrights
21st-century American dramatists and playwrights
20th-century American male writers
21st-century American male writers